The hundred of East Budleigh was the name of one of thirty two ancient administrative units of Devon, England.

The parishes in the hundred were: Aylesbeare; Bicton; Clyst Honiton; Clyst St George; Clyst St Mary; Colaton Raleigh; Dotton; East Budleigh; Farringdon; Gittisham; Harpford; Littleham (near Exmouth); Lympstone; Newton Poppleford;  Otterton; Rockbeare; Salcombe Regis; Sidbury; Sidmouth; Venn Ottery; Withycombe Raleigh and Woodbury.

See also 
 List of hundreds of England and Wales - Devon

References 

Hundreds of Devon